John J. Finnegan (born July 21, 1938) is a former American politician who served as Massachusetts State Auditor from 1981 to 1987.

A member of the Massachusetts House of Representatives since 1967, Finnegan was elected by the state legislature to fill the unexpired term of State Auditor Thaddeus M. Buczko, who resigned to become Justice of the Essex County Probate and Family Court. He was elected in his own right in 1982. He did not run for re-election in 1986 and was succeeded by Joe DeNucci.

See also
 Massachusetts House of Representatives' 18th Suffolk district

References

1938 births
Members of the Massachusetts House of Representatives
New England Law Boston alumni
Politicians from Boston
State auditors of Massachusetts
University of Massachusetts Amherst alumni
Living people